Stuck in Wonderamaland is the third album by the alternative rock group Dramarama, released in 1989.

Track listing
All songs written by John Easdale, except where noted. 
 "Wonderamaland" - 4:08
 "No Regrets" - 3:53
 "Fireplace, Pool, & Air Conditioning" - 4:20
 "Lullabye" - 3:18
 "It's Hardly Enough" - 2:33
 "Last Cigarette" - 4:55
 "70's TV" - 3:27
 "Try" - 3:22
 "Would You Like" - 3:01
 "I Wish I Was Your Mother" (Ian Hunter) - 3:32
 "Pumps on a Hill" - 0:50
 "Stuck in Wonderamaland" - 1:03

References

Dramarama albums
1989 albums
Albums produced by Val Garay